Square Lake is a tarn located in a cirque north of Mount Linn in the northern California Coast Ranges, in Tehama County, California.

Like its name states, the lake has straight shorelines that make the shape of the lake resemble a square.

See also
List of lakes in California

References

Lakes of California
Lakes of Tehama County, California
Lakes of Northern California